Măguri may refer to:

Măguri, a village in Măguri-Răcătău Commune, Cluj County, Romania
Măguri, a district in the city of Lugoj, Timiș County, Romania